Vicq is a commune in the Allier department in Auvergne-Rhône-Alpes in central France.

Vicq comes from vicus, which means central Gallo-Roman administration, on a local scale.

Geography 
It is located 13 km from Gannat, 33 km from Vichy and 5 km from Ébreuil.

Administration

Population

Its inhabitants are called "Vicquois".

Sights 
Romanesque church, classified as a historic site in 1911.

See also
Communes of the Allier department

References

Communes of Allier
Allier communes articles needing translation from French Wikipedia